U.S. Music Corp. is an American musical instrument company based in Buffalo Grove, Illinois, United States, a suburb of Chicago, that manufactures and distributes products worldwide. The company is currently a subsidiary of Canadian corporate group Exertis | JAM.

History 
On December 15, 2002, Washburn International announced it had acquired distributor U.S. Music Corporation and would be rolling its assets into USM in a reverse merger.

In mid-2009, U.S. Music was purchased by Jam Industries of Montreal, Canada.

Associated brands 
International brands owned or distributed by U.S. Music included:

  DigiTech 
  Eden Electronics
  Framus 
  Hagstrom 
  Jay Turser Guitars
  Marshall Amplifiers
  Natal Drums
  Onori Straps
  Oscar Schmidt Inc.
  Parker Guitars 
  Profile Musical Accessories
  Quik Lok stands and accessories
  Randall Amplifiers
  Warwick Basses
  Washburn Guitars

See also
 Music of the United States

References

External links 
 Company website

Musical instrument manufacturing companies of the United States
Distribution companies of the United States
Manufacturing companies based in Illinois
Companies based in Lake County, Illinois
Buffalo Grove, Illinois
JAM Industries